In cognitive psychology, a basic category is a category at a particular level of the category inclusion hierarchy (i.e., a particular level of generality) that is preferred by humans in learning and memory tasks.  The term is associated with the work of psychologist Eleanor Rosch, who demonstrated basic category preferences in a number of classic experiments.

Mathematics 
In 2016, Tom Leinster published the "Basic Category Theory", which seeks universal properties that govern in mathematics.

References 

Cognition